Ronnie Singh Jagday (born March 21, 1978 in Vancouver, British Columbia) is an international Canadian field hockey player, who played his first international match for the Canadian Men's National team in 1998, in Barcelona against Spain.  He was a member of Canada's gold-medal winning Pan American Games team in 1999 and went on to represent Canada in the Summer Olympics in 2000.

The midfielder is the son of former Canadian coach and later USA National Men's team Coach Shiv Jagday and credits his father for introducing and teaching him the finer points of the game. He currently works in Finance, with Cisco systems in, San Jose, California.

International senior competitions
 1998 — World Cup, Utrecht (8th)
 1998 - Commonwealth Games, Kuala Lumpur (not ranked)
 1999 - Akhbar El Yom Tournament, Cairo (3rd)
 1999 - Sultan Azlan Shah Tournament, Kuala Lumpur (4th)
 1999 - Pan American Games, Winnipeg (1st)
 2000 - Barcelona 4-Nation Tournament (4th)
 2000 - Sultan Azlan Shah Tournament, Kuala Lumpur (7th)
 2000 — Americas Cup, Cuba (2nd)
 2000 - Olympic Games, Sydney (10th)
 2001 — World Cup Qualifier, Edinburgh (8th)
 2003 - Pan American Games, Santo Domingo (2nd)
 2004 - Olympic Qualifying Tournament, Madrid (11th)

References
 Profile at Field Hockey Canada
 Competing at 2000 Olympic Games
 Celebrating the winning goal at 1999 Pan Am Games
 Interview for Non-oclock-gun

External links

1978 births
Canadian expatriate sportspeople in the United States
Canadian male field hockey players
Canadian sportspeople of Indian descent
Canadian people of Punjabi descent
Field hockey players at the 2000 Summer Olympics
Living people
Olympic field hockey players of Canada
Sportspeople from San Jose, California
Field hockey players from Vancouver
Pan American Games gold medalists for Canada
Pan American Games silver medalists for Canada
Pan American Games medalists in field hockey
1998 Men's Hockey World Cup players
Male field hockey midfielders
Field hockey players at the 1999 Pan American Games
Field hockey players at the 2003 Pan American Games
Medalists at the 1999 Pan American Games
Medalists at the 2003 Pan American Games